By The Gods Beloved, first published in the UK in 1905, was released under the title The Gates of Kamt in the US. The novel is in the tradition of Rider Haggard's 1887 She, and concerns a lost race of ancient Egyptians.

In her autobiography, Links in the Chains of Life, Baroness Orczy comments:

"The book that gave me more pleasure to write than any of the others is By the Gods Beloved, not only because I could allow my imagination to go roaming in hitherto unexplored realms but because I could give it full sway in picturesque descriptions of places that did not really exist, and in people and characters who could have no attributes that were entirely normal and modern."

Contents
Part I – The Gates of Kamt
Part II – Men-ne-fer
Part III – The Palace of Neit-Akrit
Part IV – Tanis

Plot summary

Background

Mark Tankerville and Hugh Emmett became firm friends whilst at school at St Paul's, their friendship cemented by many afternoons spent at Hugh's house in Hammersmith in the company of his father, one of the greatest archaeologists and Egyptologists of his generation. Mr Tankerville keeps the boys entertained with stories and theories about the people of Ancient Egypt and teaches them how to speak and understand the language of ancient Kamt.

When they finish school, Mark goes to Oxford to study medicine while Hugh stays at home to help his father with his research. During this period Mr Tankerville and Mark's Uncle both die.

After college Mark is unemployed but living off a small fortune left to him by a distant relative. He still sees Hugh occasionally but his old friend has become more and more distant as he absorbs himself in some 'important work'. Hugh apologies for his behaviour and asks that Mark gives him two years to finish his project and get back to his old self – Mark, as a qualified Doctor, is concerned that Hugh will have worked himself into the grave within two years if he keeps on as he is and makes Hugh promise that he will ask for help if he needs it.

Two years pass with no contact between the friends, until one day Mark receives a telegram from Hugh asking him to come over. His work finally finished, what Hugh reveals to his old friend is a piece of 3000-year-old parchment which he and his father have spent forty years piecing together. Hugh explains that the text proves that the ancient civilisation did not simply disappear at the close of the 6th dynasty, rather they were driven off by strangers and formed a new empire somewhere in the Libyan desert. More importantly he believes that their descendants are still living there and that the parchment clearly sets out the way to find the secret city.

The Journey

Hugh convinces Mark to accompany him on an expedition to find the hidden civilisation and a week later they are heading up the Nile on a dahabiyeh towards the mysterious immensities of the Libyan desert. From Wady-Halfa they set out towards the west, alone but for four camels. After days of walking through the monotonous heat and sandstorms, they have exhausted most of their food supplies and two of the camels have died but eventually they spot the rock of Anubis – and suddenly it appears that there might be something tangible in Hugh's conjectures after all.

The pair make their way slowly towards the rock, only to realise as they approach that the mass of white specks they have seen glinting in the sun at the base of the rock are human bones, none of which have been there for more than ten years...

Nearby is a half dead man, dressed in rags who is speaking the ancient language of Kamt, before he dies he tells them that he has been thrown out of Kamt as a punishment. All ways into the valley appear to be sealed and impassable so, down to their last few days of supplies, Mark and Hugh wait by the main gate in the hope that another criminal will be expelled – giving them a chance to enter.

Kamt

Some days later the opportunity arises and they sneak into Kamt to find themselves in the middle of a massive temple. Hiding in the background they watch an ornate ceremony take place in the middle of which is a living breathing Pharaoh, his mother, Queen Maat-kha, and the High Priest Ur-tasen. Eavesdropping on the Queen and the Priest, they discover that the Pharaoh is very ill and if he dies his throne will pass to his cousin Princess Neit-akrit, as Maat-kha cannot remain as queen if she has no son or husband to accompany her on the throne.

At this point Hugh comes out from his hiding place and tells the shocked witnesses that he has been sent by Ra. The Priest asks him what his will is, to which Hugh replies "To wed that woman and sit upon the throne of Kamt".

Hugh's actions stun Mark but probably save them from death as they are quickly accepted by those present, who fall at Hugh's feet. The pair are treated like gods: showered with food, given luxurious clothes and entertained with lavish ceremonies. Before long they have been fully integrated into palace life.

The Princess

It soon becomes obvious that Princess Neit-akrit has her detractors, for her beauty causes madness in men and jealousy in women. Even the Queen is not immune, and asks Hugh to force the Princess to become a Priestess of Ra, hoping that once she has been blinded and rendered harmless, she will no longer be a threat.

Hugh dismisses the idea, but after getting involved in the trial of one of the Princess' servants who murdered her own son rather than watch him be a slave to Neit-akrit's beauty, his curiosity is roused. He is further intrigued when, the night before he is due to visit the Princess for the first time, he is approached by a young girl. It turns out that her lover was the man cast out into the desert before they arrived, for he had fallen for the Princess and been caught trespassing in the temple on her request. The girl then gives Hugh a scarab as a talisman, to protect him from falling under Neit-akrit's spell.

Before leaving Hugh manages to upset the High Priest even further when he insists that Mark is appointed as physician to the Pharaoh, there is a bit of a power struggle between the two men but Hugh, who knows he has the support of the people comes off better and Mark takes over nursing the Pharaoh, who appears to be suffering from a form of diabetes.

Despite the Queen's concerns, all seems to go well when Hugh first meets the Princess. She is truly regal in her beauty, but Hugh appears to be immune while Mark falls for her at first look. At supper Hugh mentions the man who was expelled from Kamt for doing the Princess's bidding, which unsettles her and she comes to talk to him about it afterwards.

It becomes obvious that the Princess is making a play for Hugh but although she claims she is happy to lose her claim on the throne of Kamt, Mark is not convinced. Shortly afterwards the scarab goes missing from Hugh's room and he starts to become fascinated by the Princess – though she is less than impressed to hear he is going through with the wedding to her Aunt and is leaving for Net-amen to make the necessary arrangements. The Pharaoh is clearly passionate about the Princess but she is only pretending to be interested in his advances in an attempt to make Hugh jealous.

After a month Mark is missing Hugh so, leaving the Pharaoh in the care of some servants, he makes his excuses to the Princess and travels to Net-amen to check on his friend. Hugh looks dreadful and after some persuasion confides that he is madly in love with the Princess – a confession which makes Mark feel jealous, yet though he admires Neit-akrit, he still does not trust her.

Tanis

Tanis, where Hugh's wedding to the Queen is due to take place, is a beautiful city, full of love and romance. According to local custom Hugh must spend 24 hours alone in a pavilion in the temple gardens before his wedding. The Queen and the Pharaoh arrive together and Mark is immediately called to look after the Pharaoh, who has deteriorated since Mark left.

The Pharaoh has realised that Hugh loves the Princess rather than his mother and, out for revenge for the Queen stealing his throne from him, he tells her as much – insisting that she will pay for stealing Hugh from Neit-akrit, for the Princess loves Hugh as much as he loves her. Shaking with rage, the Queen attacks her son and strangles him to death with her bare hands.

After seeing everything, the High Priest Ur-tasen condemns Queen Maat-kha for murder and desecrating the temple. She starts to realise that there will be consequences for her actions and declares she will go willingly into the valley of the dead and leave Ur-tasen all her wealth, if only the Priest will separate Neit-akrit and Hugh once she has gone.

The Priest makes the Queen promise to the gods that she will do his bidding, which she agrees for she would rather see Hugh dead than with the Princess. He insists she must go through with the marriage ceremony as if nothing has happened, then when Hugh goes to meet her in the garden after the ceremony, he will find the dead body of the Pharaoh and they will frame him for the murder.

Mark has overheard everything and tries to warn Hugh, only to discover he is trapped in the temple and can't get out. Stuck until the wedding, Mark waits and watches, only to see Princess Neit-akrit appear next to the High Priest... who then announces "I did it all for thee Neit-akrit", for he is in love with her too and wants to see her crowned Queen once her 'enemy' has been removed.

Neit-akirt, however, has other ideas and defies the Priest to do his worst, for she will not allow Hugh to be blamed for the Pharaoh's murder. The Priest laughs at her and dares her to summon help knowing it will be his fellow priests who come. Outmanoeuvring the Princess, Ur-tasen then tells her that if she mentions any of what has happened to Hugh, the marriage will go ahead and she will have to suffer losing both her crown and the man she loves.

Faced with the impossible choice between death of her loved one or seeing him happy in another woman's arms, the Princess leaves the temple. The smell of burning herbs makes Mark think he can escape but the pungent odour starts to affect him and just before he loses consciousness he realises that he is in a room with the body of the dead Pharaoh.

The Marriage

Mark finally comes round to hear Hugh making his marriage vows. Unable to speak he can only watch as his friend pledges himself to the woman who is plotting his death and shame before sinking into yet another drugged sleep.

He comes to again several hours later, it is dark but he can just make out his friend waiting in the gloom, soon to leave and walk into the trap that had been set. Still unable to speak he is helpless to warn Hugh; however, soon Princess Neit-akrit turns up and asks Hugh to help her make a posy from the flowers in the temple. She is able to manipulate Hugh's love for her to prevent him from going to his bride and being framed for the Pharaoh's murder.

Mark shakes off the last effects of the drug, overcomes the priests who have come to finish him off, and escapes. Mark finds Hugh and tells him everything he has seen. The two are confronted by Ur-tasen who has captured Neit-akrit as she left the temple at dawn. Ur-tasen threatens to have his priests torture and mutilate Neit-akrit as is the custom in Kamt for women who have committed adultery. Hugh threatens to use his position as Beloved of the Gods to inspire the people of Kamt to revolt and leave nothing but one vast and burning ruin where Kamt now stands if Neit-akrit is not released. Ur-tasen relents but convinces Hugh that he must leave Kamt if Neit-akrit is to retain her honour and take her rightful place as Pharaoh.

The Departure

Hugh and Mark agree to leave if the priests provide them with supplies and oxen to get them through the Valley of Death and back to their civilisation. Ur-tasen must go with them as far as the Rock of Anubis as a guarantee at which point he would be released to return to Kamt. Hugh plans to leave without seeing Neit-akrit again, but as Ur-tasen is announcing that Beloved of the Gods has had to leave Kamt to return to the feet of the Gods, Neit-akrit comes up to the platform and leaves a flower--rosemary for remembrance.

Hugh and Mark make their way back to England where, years later, their adventures in Kamt all start to seem like a dream. But in a small gold casket with a glass lid Hugh keeps in front of him a dried sprig of rosemary.

External links

 Read The Gates of Kamt at Open Library

1905 British novels
1905 fantasy  novels
Novels by Baroness Emma Orczy
Novels set in Africa
Lost world novels